Wathan is a surname. Notable people with the surname include:

Dusty Wathan (born 1973), American baseball player and manager
John Wathan (born 1949), American baseball player and manager

See also
Nathan (surname)